Hypochalcia ahenella is a species of snout moth in the genus Hypochalcia. It was described by Michael Denis and Ignaz Schiffermüller in 1775 and is known from most of Europe, Turkey, and Texas in the US.

The wingspan is 23–32 mm. Adults are on wing from May to the end of August.

The larvae probably feed on Helianthemum species and/or Artemisia campestris.

References

Phycitini
Moths described in 1775
Moths of Europe
Moths of Asia
Moths of North America